Robert Vigouroux (21 March 1923 – 9 July 2017) was a French politician and writer. He was the Mayor of Marseille (the second largest city in France) from 1986 to 1995, and a French Senator for the Bouches-du-Rhone from 1989 to 1998.

Biography
Robert Vigouroux was born in Paris. In 1942, he moved to Marseilles to work as a doctor in hospitals. He was elected as Mayor of Marseille in 1986, and as Senator in 1989. He later published two volumes of poetry under the pen name of Stépan Alexis, and later essays, novels, volumes of paintings and photographs in his real name.

Bibliography

Poetry
L’Explication
Mémoires des temps passés

Essays
Un parmi les autres
Quelle est ta ville
Et si je vous disais…

Novels
La vie en morceaux
Le docteur et ses jumeaux (2003)

Paintings
Au fil du temps (2005)

Photographs
Marseille-Moderne (co-editor, 2008)

References

1923 births
2017 deaths
Politicians from Paris
Socialist Party (France) politicians
20th-century French politicians
Mayors of Marseille
French Senators of the Fifth Republic
Writers from Paris
French male poets
Senators of Bouches-du-Rhône